Hyloxalus shuar is a species of frog in the family Dendrobatidae. It is endemic to Ecuador and occurs on the eastern slopes of the Andes. Common names Santiago rocket frog and Shuar rocket frog have been proposed for it.

Description
Males measure  and females  in snout–vent length.

Habitat and conservation
Its natural habitats are premontane and cloud forests at around 1270 to 2370 m above sea level. It is threatened by habitat loss and degradation caused by agricultural development and logging.

References

shuar
Amphibians of Ecuador
Endemic fauna of Ecuador
Amphibians described in 1988
Taxonomy articles created by Polbot
Amphibians of the Andes
Taxa named by William Edward Duellman